Knyaginino is a rural locality (a selo) in Sevsky District, Bryansk Oblast, Russia. The population was 464 as of 2010. There are 5 streets.

Geography 
Knyaginino is located 10 km north of Sevsk (the district's administrative centre) by road. Pokrovsky is the nearest rural locality.

References 

Rural localities in Sevsky District